The Tom and Jerry Show is an American flash animated television series produced by Warner Bros. Animation and Turner Entertainment and animated by Renegade Animation. It is based on the Tom and Jerry characters and theatrical cartoon series created by William Hanna and Joseph Barbera. The series first premiered in Canada on Teletoon on March 1, 2014, and began airing on Cartoon Network in the United States on April 9, 2014, but also aired on Boomerang in the U.S.

Beginning in 2017, the series moved to Boomerang in the U.S. The fourth season was released on February 1, 2021, on Boomerang SVOD and on the Cartoon Network app. The fifth and final season was released on the Cartoon Network app, also on February 1, and on February 2, but the season was completely abandoned from the app and hasn't been added back. The fifth season also aired on Boomerang on February 15, 2021.

The show was followed by a HBO Max series named Tom and Jerry Special Shorts, which are by the same crew as Looney Tunes Cartoons and are in the vein of the classic shorts.  Another series, Tom and Jerry in New York, was also released on HBO Max on July 1, 2021, which is done by the same production team as The Tom and Jerry Show.

Plot 
The series follows the antics of Tom in his pursuit to catch Jerry.

Each scenario was introduced, used, or discontinued in each season. The series can follow one of these scenarios:

 Tom and Jerry's typical antics in a modern-day urban setting.
 Tom and Jerry being pets to two witches named Beatie and Hildie in a medieval setting. (It was used only in the first two seasons)
 Tom and Jerry working together as detectives in Tolucaville by operating a detective agency called "The Cat & Mouse Detectives", complete with a narrator.
 Jerry living in Dr. Bigby's laboratory with a rat named Napoleon and a very smart hamster, with Tom being an alley cat.  (It was used only in the first season)
 Tom working as a butler in a Downton Abbey property. (Introduced in the third season)
 Tom and Jerry living in a scary Transylvanian environment in a parody of Van Helsing. (It was used only in the third and fourth seasons)
 Tom working at a farm run by a farmer named Maude. (Introduced in the fourth season)
 Tom and Jerry starring in spoofs of classic fairy tales, narrated by Papa to Rutger, Rolph, and Rudy around a campfire. (Introduced in the fifth season)

Episodes

Characters

Main  
Tom Cat – An adult hapless tuxedo cat who is always trying to catch Jerry and kick him out of his house. However, he seems to be less antagonistic towards Jerry in this series, showing a love-hate relationship with him.
 Jerry Mouse – A young clever mouse who always outsmarts Tom, although they are seen working together sometimes.

Recurring 
 Spike Bulldog – An adult bad-tempered bulldog whom Tom and Jerry are frequently at odds with. However, he and Tom seem to be more friendly to each other in this series, and the former is more aware of Jerry's participation in provoke his anger, despite remaining their friendship sometimes.
 Tyke Bulldog – A small young puppy and Spike's son.
 Tuffy Mouse – A young mouse who wears a nappy and is Jerry's ward.
 Butch Cat – An adult black cat that lives on the street who is the frenemy of Tom.
 Meathead Cat – A alley cat who is friends with Butch.
 Toots (credited as "Toodles Galore") – An adult female cat with a blue bow on her head who is Tom's girlfriend.
 Chérie – A young female mouse with a blue bow around her neck who is Jerry's girlfriend.
 Little Quacker – A young duckling, who is Jerry's best friend.

Characters tied to specific scenarios consists of:
 Rick and Ginger – The owners of Tom and Spike, who are a married couple. Rick favors Spike while Ginger favors Tom.
 Hildie and Beatie – Two witches living with Tom and Jerry, in a haunted house.
 Newt – An orange Triton which uses an eyepatch. He also lives in the house of the two witches.
 Napoleon – A gray rat who is a friend of Jerry. He lives in the scientific laboratory of Dr. Bigby.
 Hamster – A clever, yet unnamed hamster who also lives in Bigby's laboratory.
 Dr. Bigby – A scientist working in a peculiar laboratory. He is also the owner of Jerry, Napoleon, Hamster and Bot.
 Rutger, Rolph, Rudy – A trio of loud German mice introduced in season 3, who live in Catsylvania.
 Cates – The top butler and boss of tom in the Downton Abbey manor.
 Maude – A farmer.

Voice cast

Production 
The Tom and Jerry Show was initially announced to consist of 26 episodes divided into 52 11-minute segments to air on Cartoon Network, with the intention to remain faithful to the original theatrical short series. The show was originally intended to premiere on Cartoon Network in 2013 before being pushed back to April 9, 2014.

From the second season onward, the art style of the show was retooled and the series running time for the segments is now 7 minutes to more closely resemble the original MGM shorts. Because of the running time switch, the half-hour episodes contain 3 segments instead of 2.

The series is produced by Warner Bros. Animation and Renegade Animation, with Renegade handling the actual production work under the supervision of Darrell Van Citters and Ashley Postelwaite, both of whom used to work for Warner Bros. before leaving to form Renegade in 1992. Renegade Animation is also known for producing Hi Hi Puffy AmiYumi and The Mr. Men Show. It is the second Tom and Jerry television series produced in the 16:9 widescreen aspect ratio and the first to be animated in Adobe Flash. It is also the second made-for-television iteration of the cartoons to emulate the theatrical shorts and the fifth made-for-television Tom and Jerry production. It was also the longest–running Tom and Jerry series, overtaking Tom & Jerry Kids.

Broadcast 
The Tom and Jerry Show premiered on March 1, 2014 on Teletoon in Canada. The series premiered on April 9, 2014 on Cartoon Network in the United States. In the United Kingdom and Ireland, it began airing on April 12, 2014 on Boomerang, and also on CITV in 2016 (including all episodes following "Say Uncle"). It premiered on April 21, 2014 on Cartoon Network in India. In Australia, Cartoon Network premiered it on May 5, 2014. The series began airing on Boomerang in the United States on January 5, 2015. In Indonesia, it is currently broadcast on GTV since February 13, 2017 and on RCTI since August 13, 2017. In China, it is broadcast on China Central Television. In Japan from September 23, 2014 NHK BS Premium broadcast it with the title New Tom and Jerry Show on December 15, 2015. In India, the show retelecasted on 14 November 2020 with new Hindi dialogues in Cartoon Network India.

Home media

Region 1 DVDs

Main series

Region 2 DVDs

Main series

Reception 

The series has received generally mixed to favorable reviews, with criticism primarily directed at the switch from traditional hand-drawn animation to flash animation since the previous Tom and Jerry TV series, Tom and Jerry Tales.

See also 
 The Tom and Jerry Show (1975)
 The Tom and Jerry Comedy Show
 Tom & Jerry Kids
 Tom and Jerry Tales
 Tom and Jerry in New York

Notes

References

External links 

 
 

.2014
2014 American television series debuts
2021 American television series endings
2010s American animated comedy television series
2020s American animated comedy television series
American children's animated adventure television series
American children's animated comedy television series
American flash animated television series
Animated television series about cats
Animated television series about mice and rats
Animated television series reboots
Boomerang (TV network) original programming
Cartoon Network original programming
English-language television shows
Television series by Warner Bros. Animation
Television series by Warner Bros. Television Studios
Television series set in the 2010s